A secret society is an organization with activities or inner functions concealed from non-members.

Secret society or Secret Society may also refer to:

Arts, entertainment, and media
Secret Society (album), a 2006 album by Europe
Secret Society (band), an American hip-hop group
"Secret Society" (Justice League), an episode of the animated series Justice League
Secret Society, a BBC documentary series that led to the Zircon affair
Darcy James Argue's Secret Society, an American steampunk big band
Secret Society of Second-Born Royals, a 2020 American contemporary science fantasy action superhero film
Secret Society of Super Villains, a fictional group of comic book characters
The Secret Society, a 2015 book about Cecil Rhodes, by Robin Brown

Other uses
Secret Society (Persia), played a role in the Persian Constitutional Revolution of 1905–1911

See also
 Society (disambiguation)
 High society (disambiguation)